Bridge over North Fork of Roanoke River was a historic Pratt truss bridge located near Ironto, Montgomery County, Virginia. It was built by the King Bridge Company in 1892, and was a pin-connected through Pratt truss spanning  between cast-in-place concrete abutments. It had ornamental steel lattice portal bracing around the top of the portals. The bridge was removed in 1995–1996, and replaced with new bridge.

The bridge was listed on the National Register of Historic Places in 1989 and delisted in 2001.

See also
List of bridges on the National Register of Historic Places in Virginia

References

Former National Register of Historic Places in Virginia
Road bridges in Virginia
Bridges completed in 1892
Buildings and structures in Montgomery County, Virginia
Pratt truss bridges in the United States